Johnson Creek Park is a city park of about  in southeast Portland, in the U.S. state of Oregon. Located at Southeast 21st Avenue and Clatsop Street, the park takes its name from Johnson Creek, which flows through the park. The creek is named for William Johnson, who settled upstream from the park in what is now Portland's Lents neighborhood, where he operated a sawmill in the mid-19th century. Crystal Springs Creek also flows through the park and meets Johnson Creek near the park's southern boundary. Amenities include a playground, paved paths, picnic tables, and a natural area.

References

External links
Johnson Creek Watershed Council

1920 establishments in Oregon
Parks in Portland, Oregon
Protected areas established in 1920
Urban public parks
Sellwood-Moreland, Portland, Oregon